"Three Coins in the Fountain" is a popular song which received the Academy Award for Best Original Song in 1955. The song was first recorded by Frank Sinatra.

Background
The melody was written by Jule Styne with lyrics by Sammy Cahn. It was written for the romance film, Three Coins in the Fountain and refers to the act of throwing a coin into the Trevi Fountain in Rome while making a wish. Each of the film's three stars (Clifton Webb, Dorothy McGuire, and Jean Peters) performs this act.

Cahn and Styne were asked to write the song to fit the movie, but were unable to either see the film or read the script. They completed the song in an hour and had produced a demonstration record with Frank Sinatra by the following day. The song was subsequently used in the film soundtrack, but in the rush, 20th Century-Fox neglected to sign a contract with the composers, allowing them to claim complete rights over the royalties.  The Sinatra recording topped the UK Singles Chart for three weeks in September and October that year.

Other recordings
The song was subsequently recorded by The Four Aces featuring Al Alberts, backed by the Jack Pleis Orchestra, in 1954.
A recording by Dinah Shore with orchestra conducted by Harry Geller was made at Radio Recorders in Hollywood, California, on March 24, 1954. It was released by RCA Victor Records as catalog number 20-5755 (in US) and by EMI on the His Master's Voice label as catalog number B 10730.  Harry James recorded a version on his 1955 album Jukebox Jamboree (Columbia CL-615). Vince Guaraldi included an instrumental version on his debut album, Vince Guaraldi Trio, in 1956.
On October 8, 1966, Steve Smith sang "Three Coins in the Fountain" in a musical tour of Italy on ABC's The Lawrence Welk Show.
Sergio Franchi sang the title song in another 20th Century Fox film made as the pilot for an unsold television series. This version was broadcast in 1970.
It was recorded by Jack Jones in 1990, and used in the film Coins in the Fountain that year.

Popular culture
It was parodied in The Goon Show to the same tune, with the words "Three Goons in a fountain, which one will the fountain drown?"
Steve Martin sings "Three Coins in a Fountain" when attempting a sing-along in the 1987 film, Planes, Trains and Automobiles.

See also
List of UK Singles Chart number ones of the 1950s

References

1954 songs
1954 singles
Songs with lyrics by Sammy Cahn
Songs with music by Jule Styne
Frank Sinatra songs
The Chantays songs
The Four Aces songs
Andy Williams songs
UK Singles Chart number-one singles
Number-one singles in the United States
Best Original Song Academy Award-winning songs
Love themes
Pop ballads
Songs about Rome
Songs written for films
RCA Victor singles
His Master's Voice singles
1950s ballads